A trumpet concerto is a concerto for solo trumpet and instrumental ensemble, customarily the orchestra. Such works have been written from the Baroque period, when the solo concerto form was first developed, up through the present day. Although comparatively rare compared to concertos for other instruments, some major composers have contributed to the trumpet concerto repertoire, such as Joseph Haydn in his Trumpet Concerto in E-flat.

Traditionally a three-movement work, the modern-day trumpet concerto has occasionally been structured in four or more movements. In some trumpet concertos, especially from the Baroque and modern eras, the trumpet is accompanied by a chamber ensemble rather than an orchestra.

Selected list of trumpet concertos
The following concertos are presently found near the centre of the mainstream Western repertoire for the trumpet.

Baroque era
Johann Sebastian Bach
Brandenburg Concerto No. 2
Joseph Arnold Gross
Trumpet Concerto in D major
Johann Friedrich Fasch
Concerto for trumpet and two oboes in D major
Johann Georg Reutter
Trumpet Concerto in D major
Franz Xavier Richter
Trumpet Concerto in D major
Antonio Vivaldi
Concerto for Two Trumpets RV 537
Francesco Onofrio Manfredini
Concerto for Two Trumpets in D major
Giuseppe Torelli
Trumpet Concerto in D, G.9
Johann Christoph Graupner
Trumpet Concerto in D major
Franz Querfurth
Trumpet Concerto in E-flat major
Johann Wilhelm Hertel
Trumpet Concerto No. 1 in E-flat major
Trumpet Concerto No. 2 in E flat major
Concerto for Trumpet and Oboe in E flat major
Joseph Riepel
Trumpet Concerto in D major
Valentin Rathgeber
Concerto for Two Trumpets in E-flat. Op. 6 No. 15
Johann Melchior Molter
Trumpet Concerto No. 1 in D major MWV 6.32
Trumpet Concerto No. 2 in D major MWV 6.33
Trumpet Concerto No. 3 in D major MWV 6.34
Concerto for Two Trumpets No. 1 in D major MWV 6.27
Concerto for Two Trumpets No. 2 in D major MWV 6.28
Concerto for Two Trumpets No. 3 in D major MWV 6.29
Concerto for Two Trumpets No. 4 in D major MWV 6.30
Concerto for Two Trumpets No. 5 in D major MWV 6.31
Georg Philipp Telemann
Trumpet Concerto in D major TWV 51:D7

Classical era
Laue (fl. c. 1760)
 Trumpet Concerto in D major

Otto (fl. c. 1770)
 Trumpet Concerto in E-flat major

Joseph Haydn
Trumpet Concerto in E-flat major (keyed trumpet)

Michael Haydn
Trumpet Concerto in C major (natural trumpet)
Trumpet Concerto in D major

Johann Baptist Georg Neruda
Trumpet Concerto in E-Flat major (keyed trumpet)

Johann Nepomuk Hummel
Trumpet Concerto in E major (keyed trumpet)

Leopold Mozart
Trumpet Concerto in D major (natural trumpet)

Wolfgang Amadeus Mozart
Trumpet Concerto K. 47c (lost)

Romantic era
Amilcare Ponchielli
Trumpet Concerto in F

Oskar Böhme
Trumpet Concerto in F minor (originally in E minor)

Modern era
Kalevi Aho
Concerto for trumpet and symphonic wind orchestra (2011)

Alexander Arutunian
Trumpet Concerto in A-flat major

Herbert Blendinger
Concerto barocco for trumpet and orchestra, Op. 33 (1977)

Peter Maxwell Davies
Trumpet Concerto (1988)

Duke Ellington
Concerto for Cootie

Michael Gilbertson
Trumpet Concerto (2017)

Geoffrey Gordon
CHASE - A Concerto for Trumpet and Orchestra after Giacometti (2017)

André Jolivet
Concertino for trumpet, piano, and orchestra (1948)
Concerto for trumpet (1954)

Lowell Liebermann
Concerto for trumpet and orchestra, Op. 74 (2001)

John Mackey
Antique Violences: Concerto for Trumpet (2017)

Ennio Morricone
UT for trumpet, timpani, bass drum and string orchestra

William P. Perry
Concerto for trumpet and orchestra

Gerhard Präsent
Heaven´s Light (Himmelslicht), concerto for trumpet and orchestra

Christopher Rouse
Heimdall's Trumpet

Philip Sawyers
Concerto for trumpet, strings and timpani (2018) (Nimbus NI 6374)

R. Murray Schafer
The Falcon's Trumpet

Frank Ticheli
Concerto for trumpet and orchestra, composed for Armando Ghitalla

Henri Tomasi
 Concerto for trumpet and orchestra (1948)

Mieczysław Weinberg
Trumpet Concerto in B-flat major, Op. 94 (1968)

Grace Williams
Concerto for trumpet and orchestra (1963)

John Williams
Concerto for trumpet and orchestra (1996)

Joe Wolfe
Concerto for trumpet and orchestra (2003)

Ellen Taaffe Zwilich
American Concerto (1994)

Heinz Karl Gruber
Aerial, Concerto for trumpet and orchestra (1998-9), composed for Håkan Hardenberger

References